Juan Ramón González de Balcarce (16 March 1773 – 12 November 1836) was an Argentine military leader and politician.

Biography

Juan was the older brother of Antonio González de Balcarce and of Marcos González de Balcarce. He fought against the British in 1807, and in the 1812–1813 military campaign in Upper Peru under General Manuel Belgrano. He was governor of Buenos Aires from 1818 to 1820. Under the government of Juan Manuel de Rosas, he served as the defense minister. In 1832, he was again elected governor of Buenos Aires. On 11 October 1833, the city was filled with announcements of a trial against Rosas. A large number of gauchos and poor people made a demonstration at the gates of the legislature, praising Rosas and demanding the resignation of Balcarce. The troops organized to fight the demonstration mutinied and joined it. The legislature finally gave up the trial, ousted Balcarce and replaced him with Juan José Viamonte. Balcarce was imprisoned and died in exile in Concepción del Uruguay.

See also
List of heads of state of Argentina

External links 
 

1773 births
1836 deaths
Governors of Buenos Aires Province
Foreign ministers of Argentina
Defense ministers of Argentina
People from Buenos Aires
Federales (Argentina)
Argentine generals
Burials at La Recoleta Cemetery